Prostomis mandibularis is a beetle of the family Prostomidae.

Tenebrionoidea
Beetles described in 1801